From Time to Time is a 1995 illustrated novel by American writer Jack Finney, the sequel to Time and Again, which tells the story of how Simon Morley, working on a secret government project in 1970, was able to travel back in time to the New York City of 1882.

Plot summary

At the end of Time and Again, Morley had prevented the meeting of the parents of the founder of the time travel Project, Dr. Danziger, and ensured that Dr. Danziger would not be born, and that the Project would not occur.

But Major Ruben Prien of the Project still has residual memories of what would have happened.  He is able to put the pieces together. He finds another time traveller, more or less stranded in the present (the 1970s) by Morley's actions. The time traveller is able to go to the point where Morley had altered time, and prevent Morley's actions. The original timeline, with the Project, is now back in place.

Morley has settled down in the 1880s, married Julia, and works as a graphic artist. In Chapter 1, Simon and Julia discuss an ailing neighbor, "Old Mr. Bostwick", who may have been a contemporary of George Washington. Mr. Finney may have chosen the name "Bostwick" as an homage to actor Barry Bostwick, who memorably played George Washington in two TV miniseries, George Washington (1984) and George Washington II: The Forging of a Nation (1986).</ref> He is, however, vaguely dissatisfied with his life. Morley, knowing that he was unable to stop the Project, eventually returns to the 1970s to see what might be going on with the Project, which has in fact become moribund.  Prien soon realizes that Morley is back, and arranges a meeting with him.

Prien persuades Morley that it might be possible to prevent World War I, and Morley travels back in time to the year 1912.  Not only does he do it to head off the devastating war, as in the original novel, he has a personal desire to travel in time.  His motive to visit the spring of 1912 is to see the brief-lived vaudeville act, "Tessie and Ted", who, we finally learn, are Morley's great aunt—and the father who died when Morley was only two years old.  He sees them, but forgoes any interaction with them.  His primary purpose in visiting 1912 is to find the mysterious "Z", a confidential agent of President Taft whose quiet trip to Europe would have assured peace and prevented the World War, had Z not vanished from the scene, after getting the written assurances he needed, but before returning home. Once Z is found, Morely can do whatever is required to prevent Z from vanishing.

Morley soon is enveloped in the blissful world of 1912 New York, seemingly meeting at every turn a woman he calls the "Jotta Girl."  Morley is able to eavesdrop on a clandestine meeting between Z and Theodore Roosevelt, and finally realizes that Z is Major Archibald Butt (an actual historical character), military aide to both Presidents Roosevelt and Taft, whom Morley has already met in the society of this New York.  He tries to get close to Butt, but is frustrated by the Jotta Girl, who Morley belatedly realizes is an agent of Dr. Danziger, original head of the Project and opponent to Prien.  Danziger, who opposes changing the past for any purpose, has figured out who Z was, and has sent the Jotta Girl to interfere with Morley.  However, Morley does not realize this until Butt is off to Europe on the R.M.S. Mauretania, seemingly ending any chance Morley might have to try to ensure that Butt completes his mission.

His purpose frustrated, Morley returns to report to Prien in the 1970s.  It is his intent then to return to Julia in the 1880s, feeling nothing further can be done.  Independently of Morley, Prien has learned that Butt was Z, and knows why Z vanished, his mission incomplete.  Butt sailed on the Titanic and did not survive.  At first, Morley refuses to make another attempt to complete his mission.  He is motivated to try again when Prien informs him of the precise date that Morley and Julia's son, Willy, will die in World War I, killed in action.

 Morley returns to 1912 and travels to Belfast, where the Titanic is under construction. Seeing no way to sabotage the vessel's construction (which would cause Butt to take another ship), Morley has little choice but to await the ship's completion and sail on her himself, having carefully planned to be near one of the lifeboats where men were permitted to board. Aboard, he meets Butt, who spurns Morley's offer to tell him how to get off the ship safely once the iceberg strikes. Butt will not leave a vessel on which women and children may die (and, according to some accounts, did act in a heroic manner during the sinking). The Jotta Girl is also aboard, and after Captain Smith fails to take Morley's warning seriously, agrees to help Morley.  They distract the helmsman, setting the ship onto a new course.  That course is the one which impacts the iceberg and sinks the ship. Had they taken no action, the ship would have missed. Butt's mission fails with his death.  The war will happen, and the only hope Morley has for Willy is that forewarned with the information about the day he is to die, that he will survive.

In an epilogue, Morley has returned to 1887, or, by now, 1888.  He is emotionally torn up not only by his responsibility for the ship's loss, but also by his attraction to the Jotta Girl, who presumably survived and returned to the 1970s.  As the book concludes, he and Julia are laying in supplies for what Morley knows will be the Blizzard of 1888.

External links

Novels about time travel
1995 American novels
Novels by Jack Finney
Sequel novels